CCBC may refer to:

 Canadian Children's Book Centre
 Canada China Business Council, an organization to promote trade between Canada and China
 China Construction Bank Corporation, a very large, Beijing-based bank
 Capitol City Baptist Church (West Avenue, Quezon City), a church in the Philippines

United Kingdom:
 Caerphilly County Borough Council, a local government authority in south east Wales
 Churchill College Boat Club, a rowing club at the University of Cambridge, England
 Christ's College Boat Club, another Cambridge rowing club
 Collingwood College Boat Club, a rowing club at the University of Durham, England
 Conwy County Borough Council, a local government authority in north Wales
 County Court Bulk Centre, a court handling non-hardcopy proceedings in England & Wales

United States:
 Community College of Baltimore County, a public college in Maryland
 Community College of Beaver County, a public college in Center Township, Pennsylvania
 Coca-Cola Bottling Co., a bottler and distributor of soft drinks
 Calvary Chapel Bible College, an unaccredited educational institution with its main school in Murrieta, California

See also

 
 CBC (disambiguation)
 CBBC (disambiguation)
 CBCC (disambiguation)